Cang County or Cangxian is a county of Hebei province, China. It is under the administration of Cangzhou City. County government offices are located in Xinhua District.

Administrative divisions
Towns:
Xingji, Jiuzhou, Dusheng, Cui'erzhuang

Townships:
Zhangguantun Township, Wangjiapu Township, Wulongtang Township, Liujiamiao Township, Fenghuadian Township, Yaoguantun Township, Daguanting Township, Gaochuan Township, Huangdipu Township, Zhifangtou Township, Xueguantun Township, Jiedi Hui Ethnic Township, Dulin Hui Ethnic Township, Litianmu Hui Ethnic Township, Dazhecun Hui Ethnic Township

External links

County-level divisions of Hebei
Cangzhou